Bruno Mingeon (born 7 September 1967 in Bourg-Saint-Maurice, Savoie) is a French bobsledder who competed from 1988 to 2006. Competing in five Winter Olympics, he won a bronze medal in the four-man event (tied with Great Britain) at Nagano in 1998. He was born in Bourg-Saint-Maurice.

At the 1999 FIBT World Championships in Cortina d'Ampezzo, Mingeon won a gold in the four-man event and a bronze in the two-man event.

References
Bobsleigh four-man Olympic medalists for 1924, 1932-56, and since 1964
Bobsleigh two-man world championship medalists since 1931
Bobsleigh four-man world championship medalists since 1930
DatabaseOlympics.com profile
FIBT profile

1967 births
Living people
Sportspeople from Savoie
Bobsledders at the 1992 Winter Olympics
Bobsledders at the 1994 Winter Olympics
Bobsledders at the 1998 Winter Olympics
Bobsledders at the 2002 Winter Olympics
Bobsledders at the 2006 Winter Olympics
French male bobsledders
Olympic bobsledders of France
Olympic bronze medalists for France
Olympic medalists in bobsleigh
Medalists at the 1998 Winter Olympics